Generation Next is the debut album by bachata group Aventura through Premium Latin Music. This album marked the start of a new generation in the genre of bachata, as the group mix bachata with other genres like Hip Hop R&B among others. This album included six songs from Trampa De Amor, their original first album during their time as Los Tinellers.
These six songs were modernized for the debut album. This included the lead single, Cuando Volverás. The album peaked at number 19 on the Billboard Tropical Albums chart. A vinyl was released on August 14, 2020, to celebrate the 20th anniversary of the album.

Track listing

 The English version of Cuando Volveras is actually more of a bilingual (English & Spanish) version of the song. It is sometimes referred as a Spanglish version .

Charts

References

External links
Aventura official site

1999 albums
Aventura (band) albums